MV Connemara is a RORO passenger and freight ferry currently sailing across the Cook Strait in New Zealand on StraitNZ's Bluebridge service, after being purchased from Stena RoRo. From 2007 to 2010, she was operated by Balearia as Borja, then between 2010 and 2011 as Baltic Amber for AVE Lines and then DFDS Seaways, before subsequently spending four years on charter to LD Lines. She spent the majority of autumn 2014 and 2015 on charter to Inter Shipping sailing from Algeciras, Spain, when she was then chartered by ANEK Lines, being replaced by Nova Star Cruisess Nova Star. The ship was renamed Asterion which comes from Greek Mythology of Asterion, the King of Crete. 

Connemara is named after a a region in the province of Connacht in western Ireland, facing the Atlantic Ocean.

History

Connemara was launched on 18 December 2006 as Borja and was completed on 11 May 2007. She was chartered to Stena Line during construction and was thought to be called Stena Ausonia but this did not happen and instead Stena chartered her to Balearia for services in Spain, she started operating between Barcelona and Palma on 20 May 2007. In June that same year she was sold to Stena RORO, London. 

In 2010 she ended her charter to Balearia and was sent to Rotterdam where that same year she was chartered to AVE Lines and renamed Baltic Amber, operating between Travemünde and Ventspils, and later that month from Travemünde to Riga. In October 2010 she was chartered to DFDS Seaways for service between Klaipeda and Kiel.

In 2011 she was chartered to LD Lines for service between Marseille and Tunis, but soon after moved to a new Saint Nazaire-Gijon "Motorway of the Sea" route, replacing Norman Trader. She was renamed Norman Asturias in June 2011 and she remained on same route until November 2013 when she was transferred to LD Lines' new Poole-Santander service. From 3 February 2014 the ferry also commenced a weekly service from Poole to Gijon, although the first scheduled sailing from Gijon was cancelled because of severe weather. She has a capacity for 518 passengers, 120 freight vehicles and 195 cars.

When LD Lines carried out a business review in late August 2014 which included the closure of their two Spanish routes from Poole, Norman Asturias finished her final sailing in early September and was then laid up of Saint Nazaire. Norman Asturias started service between Spain and Morocco for Inter in October 2014 after her LD Lines livery was removed and she was then later transferred from the Italian to the Danish Flag in December 2014.

On 16 January 2018, Brittany Ferries announced it would charter Norman Asturias for a new twice-weekly route starting on 6 May 2018 between Cork, Ireland and Santander, along with an additional route between Cork and Roscoff, France with the name Connemara. The line described the ship as "no-frills" with basic onboard service.

Connemara was sold to StraitNZ in December 2022 to replace the ageing .  On 29 January 2023 Connemara arrived in Wellington, New Zealand to begin her "Bluebridge" inter-island service across the Cook Strait to Picton for StraitNZ. She will replace , which will shift to Straitsman schedule. Her pet-friendly cabins are a first for StraitNZ.

References

External links

 Brittany Ferries Connemara

Ships built by Cantiere Navale Visentini
Ferries of Italy
2006 ships